SFTP may refer to:

Computing
 SSH File Transfer Protocol, a network protocol used for secure file transfer over secure shell
 Secure file transfer program, a SSH File Transfer Protocol client from the OpenSSH project
 Simple File Transfer Protocol, an unsecured file transfer protocol from the early days of the Internet
 Screened fully shielded twisted pair, a kind of network cable

Other
 Science for the People, a U.S. left-wing organization and magazine
 Six Flags Theme Parks, chain of amusement parks and theme parks
 Stray from the Path, an American metalcore band
 Supplemental Federal Test Procedure, EPA fuel economy testing procedures which supplement FTP-75 standard

See also 
 FTPS, or FTP over SSL, another name used to encompass a number of ways in which FTP software can perform secure file transfers